Edward Adam Davis (born June 5, 1989) is an American professional basketball player for Mets de Guaynabo of the Baloncesto Superior Nacional (BSN). He played high school basketball at Benedictine High School in Richmond, Virginia. He is the son of former NBA player Terry Davis. He was selected with the 13th overall pick in the 2010 NBA draft by the Toronto Raptors.

High school career
Davis spent his first two years of high school playing basketball at Hanover High School in Mechanicsville, Virginia before transferring to Benedictine High School in Richmond, Virginia. There, he led Benedictine to two state championships while averaging 22 points, 14 rebounds and 7 blocks as a senior. He accompanied future Tar Heel teammates Tyler Zeller and Larry Drew II in the McDonald's All-American Game and was selected to the Jordan Brand All-American Team. He was named Mr. Basketball of Virginia in 2008, which is given to Virginia's best high school basketball player. He also received recognition as the co-player of the year in 2007.

Considered a five-star recruit by Rivals.com, Davis was listed as the No. 4 power forward and the No. 15 player in the nation in 2008.

College career
Davis played in every game during the 2008–09 season, while starting in two of them. He averaged 6.7 points, 7.0 rebounds, and 18.8 minutes per game in his first season with the Tar Heels. Davis also led the team with 65 blocks with an average of 1.7 per game. In North Carolina's six wins during the 2009 NCAA basketball tournament, Davis averaged 8.2 points and 5.5 rebounds. In the 2009 NCAA championship game, Davis came off the bench to score 11 points and grab a team-high 8 rebounds, helping the Tar Heels to an 89–72 win over Michigan State. Davis was also named to the 2009 All-Freshman Team and was co-recipient of the team's Most Improved Player award.

In April 2009, Davis announced he would return to North Carolina after his freshman year instead of declaring for the NBA draft. In February 2010, he suffered a broken wrist in a loss to Duke, which effectively ended his season. In 2009–10, he played 23 games, averaging 13.4 points, 9.6 rebounds, 1.0 assists and 2.8 blocks per game. Davis was seen as a projected top three pick in the 2009 NBA draft had he declared .

In April 2010, Davis declared for the NBA draft, foregoing his final two years of college eligibility. He signed with sports agent Rob Pelinka.

Professional career

Toronto Raptors (2010–2013)
Davis in the 2009 NBA draft was seen as a projected top three pick . Davis was selected by the Toronto Raptors with the 13th overall pick in the 2010 NBA draft. On July 6, 2010, he signed with the Raptors. After a month with the Raptors, Davis was assigned to the Erie BayHawks. On November 29, 2010, Davis was recalled by the Raptors. On December 1, 2010, he made his NBA debut against the Washington Wizards, recording 11 points, 6 rebounds, and 2 blocks. On April 5, 2011, Davis recorded a career-high 22 points against the New York Knicks.

Memphis Grizzlies (2013–2014)
On January 30, 2013, Davis was traded to the Memphis Grizzlies, along with Tayshaun Prince and Austin Daye of the Detroit Pistons, in a three team deal that also sent teammate José Calderón to the Pistons, and Rudy Gay and Hamed Haddadi of the Grizzlies to the Raptors.

On June 30, 2014, the Grizzlies declined the opportunity to tender a qualifying offer to Davis, making him an unrestricted free agent.

Los Angeles Lakers (2014–2015)
On July 23, 2014, Davis signed with the Los Angeles Lakers and played 79 games during the season averaging 8.3 points 7.6 rebounds and 1.2 rebounds with a season high points of 20.

Portland Trail Blazers (2015–2018)
On July 9, 2015, Davis signed a three-year, $20 million contract with the Portland Trail Blazers. On November 20, 2015, he recorded 17 points and 15 rebounds in a 102–91 win over the Los Angeles Clippers. His 15 rebounds included a career-high 10 offensive rebounds, the most for a Blazer since Greg Oden had 10 in December 2009. He also became the first Blazers player to have at least 15 points and 15 rebounds off the bench since Travis Outlaw in 2006.

On March 1, 2017, Davis was ruled out for the rest of the 2016–17 season after requiring arthroscopic surgery on his left shoulder to repair an injured labrum.

Brooklyn Nets (2018–2019)
On July 23, 2018, Davis signed with the Brooklyn Nets. Davis only missed one game during the season and he averaged a low 5.8 points and had more rebounds then points with 8.6 rebounds and not even a whole assist with only 0.8 a game his season high points was 17 and his rebounds was only one less with 16 which was actually pretty unique especially because you get multiple points per FG but only one “point” per rebound.

Utah Jazz (2019–2020)
On July 20, 2019, Davis signed with the Utah Jazz. On November 2, 2019, the Utah Jazz announced that Davis suffered from a fractured left fibula during a seasons game vs. the Sacramento Kings and was expected to be sidelined for about four weeks.

Minnesota Timberwolves (2020–2021)
On November 23, 2020, Davis was traded to the New York Knicks, and on November 24 he was traded once again, this time to the Minnesota Timberwolves.

Cleveland Cavaliers (2021–2022)
On October 13, 2021, Davis signed with the Cleveland Cavaliers.

Mets de Guaynabo (2023–present) 
On February 4, 2023, Davis signed with Mets de Guaynabo of the Baloncesto Superior Nacional (BSN).

Career statistics

NBA

Regular season

|-
| style="text-align:left;"|
| style="text-align:left;"|Toronto
| 65 || 17 || 24.6 || .576 ||  || .555 || 7.1 || .6 || .6 || 1.0 || 7.7
|-
| style="text-align:left;"|
| style="text-align:left;"|Toronto
| 66 || 9 || 23.2 || .513 || .000 || .670 || 6.6 || .9 || .6 || 1.0 || 6.3
|-
| style="text-align:left;"|
| style="text-align:left;"|Toronto
| 45 || 24|| 24.2 || .549 ||  || .647 || 6.7 || 1.2 || .6 || .8 || 9.7
|-
| style="text-align:left;"|
| style="text-align:left;"|Memphis
| 36 || 4 || 15.1 || .517 ||  || .569 || 4.4 || .2 || .4 || 1.3 || 5.1
|-
| style="text-align:left;"|
| style="text-align:left;"|Memphis
| 63 || 4 || 15.2 || .534 ||  || .528 || 4.1 || .4 || .3 || .7 || 5.7
|-
| style="text-align:left;"|
| style="text-align:left;"|L.A. Lakers
| 79 || 24 || 23.3 || .601 ||  || .487 || 7.6 || 1.2 || .6 || 1.2 || 8.3
|-
| style="text-align:left;"|
| style="text-align:left;"|Portland
| 81 || 0 || 20.8 || .611 ||  || .559 || 7.4 || 1.1 || .7 || .9 || 6.5
|-
| style="text-align:left;"|
| style="text-align:left;"|Portland
| 46 || 12 || 17.2 || .528 ||  || .617 || 5.3 || .6 || .3 || .5 || 4.3
|-
| style="text-align:left;"|
| style="text-align:left;"|Portland
| 78 || 0 || 18.9 || .582 || .000 || .667 || 7.4 || .5 || .4 || .7 || 5.3
|-
| style="text-align:left;"|
| style="text-align:left;"|Brooklyn
| 81 || 1 || 17.9 || .616 || .000 || .617 || 8.6 || .8 || .4 || .4 || 5.8
|-
| style="text-align:left;"|
| style="text-align:left;"|Utah
| 28 || 1 || 10.8 || .478 ||  || .500 || 3.8 || .4 || .4 || .3 || 1.8
|-
| style="text-align:left;"|
| style="text-align:left;"|Minnesota
| 23 || 7 || 13.0 || .432 ||  || .833 || 5.0 || .9 || .6 || .6 || 2.1
|-
| style="text-align:left;"|
| style="text-align:left;"|Cleveland
| 31 || 3 || 6.5 || .688 ||  || .429 || 2.1 || .2 || .1 || .3 || .9
|- class="sortbottom"
| style="text-align:center;" colspan="2"|Career
| 722 || 106 || 19.1 || .567 || .000 || .583 || 6.4 || .7 || .5 || .8 || 5.9

Playoffs

|-
| style="text-align:left;"|2013
| style="text-align:left;"|Memphis
| 8 || 0 || 6.0 || .417 ||  || .750 || 1.4 || .0 || .0 || .1 || 1.6
|-
| style="text-align:left;"|2014
| style="text-align:left;"|Memphis
| 7 || 0 || 3.6 || .300 ||  || .000 || 2.1 || .0 || .1 || .4 || .9
|-
| style="text-align:left;"|2016
| style="text-align:left;"|Portland 
| 11 || 0 || 18.6 || .525 || .000 || .576 || 6.8 || 1.3 || .2 || .6 || 5.5
|-
| style="text-align:left;"|2018
| style="text-align:left;"|Portland 
| 4 || 0 || 17.8 || .500 ||  || .250 || 8.0 || .0 || .0 || .3 || 2.8
|-
| style="text-align:left;"|2019
| style="text-align:left;"|Brooklyn 
| 3 || 0 || 13.7 || .700 ||  || 1.000 || 6.3 || .7 || .0 || .3 || 5.3 
|- class="sortbottom"
| style="text-align:center;" colspan="2"|Career
| 33 || 0 || 11.8 || .500 || .000 || .568 || 4.6 || .5 || .1 || .4 || 3.2

College

|-
| style="text-align:left;"|2008–09
| style="text-align:left;"|North Carolina
| 38 || 2 || 18.8 || .518 ||  || .573 || 6.6 || .6 || .4 || 1.7 || 6.7
|-
| style="text-align:left;"|2009–10
| style="text-align:left;"|North Carolina
| 23 || 23 || 27.9 || .578 ||  || .659 || 9.6 || 1.0 || .4 || 2.8 || 13.4
|- class="sortbottom"
| style="text-align:center;" colspan="2"|Career
| 61 || 25 || 22.2 || .548 ||  || .623 || 7.7 || .7 || .4 || 2.1 || 9.2

Personal life
Davis is the son of Angela Jones and Terry Davis.

See also

References

External links

 

1989 births
Living people
20th-century African-American people
21st-century African-American sportspeople
African-American basketball players
American expatriate basketball people in Canada
American men's basketball players
Basketball players from Richmond, Virginia
Basketball players from Washington, D.C.
Brooklyn Nets players
Cleveland Cavaliers players
Erie BayHawks (2008–2017) players
Los Angeles Lakers players
McDonald's High School All-Americans
Memphis Grizzlies players
Minnesota Timberwolves players
North Carolina Tar Heels men's basketball players
Parade High School All-Americans (boys' basketball)
Portland Trail Blazers players
Power forwards (basketball)
Toronto Raptors draft picks
Toronto Raptors players
Utah Jazz players